This is a complete list of the candidates (excluding substitutes) that ran for the 2009 European Parliament election under a Libertas list.

Preamble
Libertas is a political party founded by Declan Ganley that took part in the 2009 European Parliament election in several member states of the European Union. For the purposes of contending those elections, Libertas candidates ran under lists (the lists of candidates presented to voters in a European election) branded with the Libertas identity, as exemplified by the French approach. Each list was made up of some combination of the following:
 members of member parties (member parties usually had names in the Libertas X format e.g. "Libertas Sweden")
 members of affiliate parties (parties that were not members of Libertas.eu but cooperate with it electorally)
 individual members (people who chose to join Libertas.eu as individuals. Candidates that ran under Libertas lists but who had no national party membership were automatically individual members).

Summary
A summary of Libertas's candidates is as follows:

Candidates
A complete list of the candidates (excluding substitutes) that ran for the 2009 European Parliament election under Libertas lists is as follows:

Results

Notes

References

Libertas.eu
2009 European Parliament election
Party lists